I Walk is the fifth English-language album by German singer Herbert Grönemeyer, released in October 2012. All songs on this album are sung in English. Ten of these songs are English reworks of previous works, and three are newly written songs for this album.

The album peaked at #18 in Germany, #19 in Austria and #48 in Switzerland.

Track listing

References

2012 albums
EMI Records albums
Herbert Grönemeyer albums
Albums produced by Alex Silva